Mesut İktu (Ankara, 22 May 1947) is a Turkish operatic baritone, administrator and voice teacher. He was manager and artistic director of the Turkish State Opera and Ballet 1987-1991 and again 2001-2003.

Discography
 Türk ezgileri - Turkish Folksongs. Kalan. 2009
 The Art of Turkish Song - Necil Kazım Akses (1908-1999), Ahmet Adnan Saygun (1907-1991), Nevit Kodallı (1924-2009), İlhan Usmanbaş (1921-), Muammer Sun (1932-), Cenan Akın (1932-2006), İlhan Baran (1934-), Cemal Reşit Rey (1904-1985), Ulvi Cemal Erkin (1906-1973), Gürer Aykal (1942-). Mesut Iktu, baritone. Sergey Gavrilov, piano VMS
 Bariton Opera arias - Ahmed Adnan Saygun, Gürer Aykal, Rachmaninoff, Tchaikovsky, Wagner, Verdi, Schubert, Brahms, Mahler and Glinka. cond. Maciej Niesiołowski. Kalan Music 2009.

References

20th-century Turkish male opera singers
Operatic baritones
1947 births
Living people
Musicians from Ankara
21st-century Turkish male opera singers